Kirloskar Institute of Management is an institute in education through the two-year Post Graduate Diploma in Management (PGDM)

Other activities include Management Development Programs, Training and Consultancy for Industry, Academic research and conferences.

Kirloskar Institute of Management is an AICTE approved Institution.

In 1991, Kirloskar Institute of Management was conceived as a training institute and a knowledge hub where Kirloskar Group managers shared their learning and caught up with the latest movements and concepts in management.

In 1995, the training institute was opened to managers all other the country.

External links

Business schools in Maharashtra
Business schools in Karnataka